= Trichardt School for Christian Education =

Location
- Avenida Armando Tivane, 1961; Maputo; Mozambique
- Coordinates: 25°57′32.9″S 32°35′9.6″E

Information
- School type: Primary School and High School
- Religious affiliation: Reformed Church of Mozambique
- Founded: 1993
- Founders: Pieter and Jeanette Botha
- Headmistress: Thelma Leppert
- Grades: 0 to 12
- Language: English, Portuguese, French, Afrikaans

Trichardt School for Christian Education, colloquially known as Sul Africana is a Christian Primary and High School located in Sommerschield Maputo, Mozambique. The school was founded in 1993 at 55 Avenida da Base N'Tchinga, but has since relocated to 1961 Avenida Armando Tivane (2025). and administered the South African IEB curriculum from 1993 to 2025. Currently, the school is crossing over to the Cambridge International Curriculum. The academic year starts in January and ends in December.

== Notable alumni ==
- Evangelos Vellios, Amatuks Assistant Coach & TuksFootball Technical Director
